The Iril River is a river that runs through the eastern suburbs of the city of Imphal in the state of Manipur, India. The name Iril derives from two words Ee and Rei/Ree. The Meitei word Ee, which means blood, although "Ee" is also the first syllable in the Meitei word for anything "water" related such as "Ee-shing" which simply means water. So words suffixed with the syllable "Ee" can also denote different forms of water e.g. "ee-ram" (path of water), ee-phut" (spring), "ee-mai" (water surface), "ee-chel" (speed of running water) etc. And the word Rei/Ree, means river. Literally translated, it could be Iril indicates "river of blood", but more likely, since both the syllables in this bi-syllabic word indicate water or river in two different languages, it could simply still mean a river, and probably does, considering the context.

Course
It originates from Lakhamai village, and flows through Ngamju Village. The river then runs through  Saikul, Sagolmang area and flows through Lamlai, Top, Naharup, Pangong, and Irilbung before it joins with the Imphal River. It is fed with fresh water from the streams, very clear. The water supplies a plant located in Porompat.
It is one of the headstreams of the Manipur River.
The Iril River still has a large population of endangered indigenous fish called ngaton, Meitei sareng. These fish are captured by local fisherman in the months of July and August.

References

Rivers of Manipur
Imphal
Rivers of India